The 1883 U.S. National Championships (now known as the US Open) took place on the outdoor grass courts at the Newport Casino in Newport, United States. The tournament ran from 21 August until 24 August. It was the 3rd staging of the U.S. National Championships, and the second Grand Slam tennis event of the year.

Finals

Singles

 Richard D. Sears defeated  James Dwight 6–2, 6–0, 9–7

Doubles

 Richard D. Sears /  James Dwight def.  Arthur Newbold /  Alexander Van Rensselaer 6–0, 6–2, 6–2

External links
Official US Open website

 
U.S. National Championships
U.S. National Championships (tennis) by year
U.S. National Championships (tennis)
U.S. National Championships (tennis)